The Kreuzspitze is a mountain in the Schnalskamm group of the Ötztal Alps.
It is one of the tallest peaks in its area.

Access roads and normal climbing route
To access the mountain you walk from Vent in the direction of Martin Busch hut which is at 2501 meters above the sea. This is a walk up, and it is normally free of snow in the summer time. Plan between 4 and 5 hours from Vent to the summit. From the village to the hut takes 2 to 3 hours.

Vent is at around 1900 meters above the sea level and it is accessible by car following a rather good road from Solden (Soelden, Sölden).

External links 
 Kreuzspitze in Mountains for Everybody.

Mountains of Tyrol (state)
Mountains of the Alps
Alpine three-thousanders
Ötztal Alps